Diplophos australis is a species of stomiiformes in the family Gonostomatidae.

References 

Gonostomatidae
Animals described in 1990